Hmwaveke (’Moaveke) is a Kanak language of New Caledonia, in the commune of Voh.

References

New Caledonian languages
Languages of New Caledonia